Opposite Way is the second studio album from the Christian band Leeland, released on February 26, 2008. The album reached #1 on the iTunes Store Christian Albums chart in its debut week. "Count Me In" and the title track "Opposite Way" have been released as radio singles.

Track listing

Singles
"Count Me In" (Peaked at #25 on Billboard's Hot Christian Songs chart). 
"Opposite Way"

Music videos
"Count Me In" (January 4, 2008)

Awards

The album was nominated for a Dove Award for Praise & Worship Album of the Year at the 40th GMA Dove Awards.

References

External links
"Opposite Way" review on The Album Project

2008 albums
Essential Records (Christian) albums
Leeland (band) albums